Elizabeth II (1926–2022) was Queen of the United Kingdom and other Commonwealth realms from 1952 to 2022.

Elizabeth II or Elisabeth II may also refer to:
 Elisabeth II, Abbess of Quedlinburg (1542–1584), Princess-Abbess of Quedlinburg
 Queen Elizabeth 2, an ocean liner
 Queen Elizabeth II (painting), a painting by Henry Ward
 Queen Elizabeth II Centre, a conference facility in the City of Westminster, London

See also
 
 Isabel II, for the Spanish equivalent of "Elizabeth II"
 List of things named after Elizabeth II
 QE2 (disambiguation)
 Queen Elizabeth (disambiguation)